Presidency Higher Secondary School is a higher secondary school in Reddiarpalayam, Puducherry-10, India.

References

External links

High schools and secondary schools in Puducherry